WAYR (550 kHz) is a non-profit radio station licensed to Fleming Island, Florida, and serving the Jacksonville metropolitan area.  It broadcasts a Christian Talk and Teaching radio format, and is owned by Good Tidings Trust, Inc.  It airs programs supplied by national Christian leaders and asks for donations on the air.

Programming is also heard on a 250-watt FM translator station, W277DE at 103.3 MHz.  In addition, Good Tidings Trust operates another FM station, 90.7 WAYR-FM, licensed to Brunswick, Georgia, which is separately programmed with Christian contemporary music.

Programming
WAYR's schedule includes Christian talk and teaching programs such as: Grace to You with John MacArthur, In Touch with Charles Stanley, Thru the Bible with J. Vernon McGee, Insight for Living with Chuck Swindoll, Love Worth Finding with Adrian Rogers, The Alternative with Tony Evans, Family Life Today with Dennis Rainey, Focus on the Family with Jim Daly, Living on the Edge with Chip Ingram, Truth for Life with Alistair Begg, Walk in the Word with James MacDonald, and A New Beginning with Greg Laurie.

History
WAYR began broadcasting on May 26, 1960, and was initially a daytime only station running 1,000 watts, with its transmitter located at 661 Blanding Blvd. in Orange Park, Florida.  In 1986 WAYR's operations were moved to 2500 Russell Road in Green Cove Springs, Florida, where it remains today, and its power was increased to 2,500 watts.  In the early 2000s, WAYR added nighttime operations of 500 watts and increased its daytime power to 5,000 watts.  In the early 2010s, the station changed its city of license to Fleming Island, Florida, although the transmitter, studios and offices remain in Green Cove Springs.

Translators

References

External links
WAYR's official website

AYR
Radio stations established in 1960
1960 establishments in Florida